Rescue Shot is a PlayStation 3D light gun video game which was released in Japan and Europe in 2000. Compatible with the controller, GunCon and the PlayStation Mouse the title is non-violent and aimed at younger players, but more forgiving of poor accuracy than others in the genre. Players watch over the game's hero, Bo, as he absentmindedly makes his way through each location, dealing with enemies and manoeuvering him past dangers.

Gameplay
Players assume the role of a mysterious power caused by the dream fragment protecting Bo, a harmless rabbit who has lost his memory after falling from a cliff due to the mischievous Bully Brothers, a group of five colored bats. Bo travels to the end of each level to a given world, oblivious to danger, searching the other four dream fragments he needs to restore it granting a wish. Bo also meets three secondary characters: Hunter (a fox rookie detective and also his friend), Trixie (a dishonest blonde girl), and Earl Grey (a famous thief sought by Hunter).

Enemies and bosses attack Bo throughout the game, the player must repel them. Obstacles and traps must be destroyed by being shot or bypassed by shooting Bo in the head or rump, neither of which harms him. Shooting Bo in the head causes him to fall over, avoiding any head-height attacks or obstacles and stopping him from moving for a few seconds. Shooting instead Bo in the rump causes him to leap forwards, potentially leaping over traps and obstacles. Standard rounds of ammunition are infinite, while stronger ones represented by acorns act as explosives but are in limited supply.

Bo's life gauge is reduced by one point every time he is attacked or damaged (six initial notches are available), but if it's allowed to empty, the game will over. Bo restores his own life points by eating any fruit he comes across on his way, though a poisonous mushroom can harm him, requiring the player to destroy it by shooting it before Bo has a chance to eat it. An extra notch is also obtained by picking ten dream fragments, which are two kinds, small and big (the latter being worth five); the player can raise the gauge up to twenty notches.

Rescue Shot comprises four areas and a total of ten levels, covering fantasy locations such as a magic kingdom, a castle and a mineshaft with trolleys, alongside a futuristic city with clockwork robots. Bonus targets are spread throughout the game's stages, allowing players to increase their score, as well as acorn bullets and dream fragments which are collected by the player shooting them.

After each level, the player's result is broken down for: scores gained along its course, firing accurance, shooting apart enemies and bonus targets, and completing it quickly.

Reception
The Australian Broadcasting Corporation's reviewer awarded the game 2 out of 5, citing the brevity of the game and lack of replay value since the game has no unlockable extras and progression is linear.

GameSpot's James Mielke stated that the game was more like the Point Blank series rather than Time Crisis due to "focusing more on the crazy game dynamics of its unique gameworld", in GameSpot's preview. He also commented "it seems as if Namco is determined to make sure its coolest peripheral gets some usage", referring to the GunCon.

In Japan, Famitsu magazine scored the game a 30 out of 40.

Notes

References

External links
 Official Japanese website 

2000 video games
Light gun games
Namco games
Now Production games
PlayStation (console) games
PlayStation (console)-only games
Multiplayer and single-player video games
Video games developed in Japan